The fourth season of the ABC reality television series The Bachelorette premiered on May 19, 2008, after a three-year absence. This season featured 26-year-old DeAnna Pappas, a real estate agent from Newnan, Georgia. Pappas was rejected by Brad Womack in the eleventh season of The Bachelor. This was the first The Bachelor franchise including the spin-off, The Bachelorette to expand from 60 to 120 minutes for the entire season.

The season concluded on July 7, 2008, with Pappas accepting a proposal from 26-year-old professional snowboarder Jesse Csincsak. Their wedding was set for May 9, 2009, but they ended their engagement in November 2008.

Contestants

Future appearances

The Bachelor
Jason Mesnick was chosen as the lead of the thirteenth season of The Bachelor, with Pappas making a surprise appearance in the finale. Pappas made another appearance in the fifteenth season premiere of The Bachelor to receive a formal apology from Brad Womack.

Bachelor Pad
Graham Bunn returned for the second season of Bachelor Pad.  He and his partner, Michelle Money, were the runners-up. 

Ryan Hoag returned for the third season of Bachelor Pad. He was eliminated during week 2.

Bachelor in Paradise
Bunn returned for the first season of Bachelor in Paradise.  He split from his partner, AshLee Frazier, during week 7.

Other appearances
Outside of the Bachelor Nation franchise, Bunn appeared as a contestant in the Bachelors vs. Bachelorettes special during season 7 of Wipeout.

Call-out order

 The contestant received the first impression rose
 The contestant received a rose during a date
 The contestant was eliminated
 The contestant was eliminated during a date
 The contestant won the competition
Explanatory notes

Episodes

Post-show
In November 2008, the couple announced their breakup.

DeAnna married Stephen Stagliano, twin brother of The Bachelorette season 5 contestant Michael Stagliano, on October 22, 2011. DeAnna and Stephen have two children together, Addison Marie (born February 6, 2014) and Austin Michael (born March 1, 2016).

Jesse married Ann Lueders, who was a contestant on season 13 of The Bachelor, on August 28, 2010. Jesse and Ann have three children together, Noah Theodore (born February 3, 2011), Charlotte Jeanne (born March 17, 2014), and Carter James (born December 27, 2016).

References

External links
The Bachelorette official site

2008 American television seasons
The Bachelorette (American TV series) seasons
Television shows filmed in California
Television shows filmed in Texas
Television shows filmed in Washington (state)
Television shows filmed in Colorado
Television shows filmed in North Carolina
Television shows filmed in the Bahamas
Television shows filmed in Georgia (U.S. state)